Tia Mare is a commune in Olt County, Oltenia, Romania. It has 4496 inhabitants, nearly all of whom are Romanians and Romanian Orthodox. The commune is composed of three villages: Doanca, Potlogeni and Tia Mare.

Natives
 Nicolae Spîrcu

References

Communes in Olt County
Localities in Oltenia